Nadine Lewington (born 15 October 1980) is an English actress, most notable for her role as Dr. Maddy Young on Holby City.

Early and personal life
Born 15 October 1980, in Chelmsford, Essex, she is the eldest daughter of Tony and Sonia Lewington, and has one sister, Vania.

Lewington attended the Anglo European School in Ingatestone. She then trained at Braintree College where she gained a BTEC National Diploma in Performing Arts, and then Middlesex University's Drama Studio in London, graduating in 2003 with a BA Hons in Drama.

She is married to actor, singer, and songwriter Michael Malarkey, with whom she has two sons.

Career
Lewington has played the roles of Maggi in drama the Dream Team and Abi Steel in the soap opera Family Affairs. She appeared in Casualty as Sasha Ryman in series 20, episode 22, entitled "It's a Man Thing".

In October 2006, it was announced that Lewington had joined the cast of the BBC medical drama Holby City as Senior House Officer Maddy Young. In 2009, the actress left Holby City and her character was killed off.

In 2010, she played Erica Verdon in BBC soap opera Doctors.

In 2012, Lewington had a role in ITV drama Lewis, playing the role of Liv Nash in the episode The Soul of Genius.

In 2016, Lewington played the role of Suzy, Jana's friend, in the American miniseries Containment.

She modelled for fashion house Frost French, owned by Sadie Frost.

Filmography

Film

Television

References

External links 

English soap opera actresses
English television actresses
1980 births
Living people
Actors from Chelmsford
Alumni of the Drama Studio London
Alumni of Middlesex University